Dugadda, sometimes spelled Dogadda, is a town and a municipal board in Pauri Garhwal district in the state of Uttarakhand, India. Dugadda is a small town which is surrounded by mountains and situated on the banks of Khoh.

Geography
It has an average elevation of 932 metres (3,058 feet). The town is surrounded by mountains and is located next to the Khoh river. .it is situated at the bank of two rivers which combines together.

Demographics
As of the 2011 India census, Dugadda had a total population of 2422, including 254 who were under 6 years of age. Of the population, 1215 were male and 1207 female. Dugadda has an average literacy rate of 81%: male literacy is 86% and female literacy is 75%.

History

Before the emergence of Kotdwar, Dugadda was the hub of commercial activities of Garhwal. In 1953, Kotdwar got connected via railway, which resulted in major businesses shifting base to the city, a position it continues to hold.

Education

Dugadda has two Government Intermediate Colleges. These began as D.A.V. Inter College, established by Raisahib Pt. Ram Dutt Naithani who was a prominent personality of his time. The principal of the college in 1975 was Dr. Shiv Prasad Dabral 'Charan', the historian who wrote Uttarakhand Ka Itihas. Under the management of Pt. Sarveshar Dutt Naithani, the college was transferred to Government management and separated into two single-sex colleges, an Industrial Training Institute (ITI) and three private primary-level English medium schools.

References

External links
 on wikimapia

Cities and towns in Pauri Garhwal district